Chenab may refer to:

Places
 Chenab River
 Chenab, Iran
 Chenab valley
 Chenab Bridge

Other
 SS Chenab, a ship
Chenab Bridge
Chenab Express
Chenab College (disambiguation), several colleges
 Chenab Group